Asociación Deportiva y Recreativa Jicaral is a Costa Rican football club from the village of Jicaral, Lepanto, Puntarenas, Costa Rica. It was founded in 1981 and currently play in the Primera División de Costa Rica following their promotion in 2019.

Jicaral played in three consecutive promotion playoff matches, losing in 2017 and 2018 to Grecia and San Carlos before defeating Guanacasteca in 2019 to earn promotion.

Stadium
The Civic Association Stadium Jicaraleña is a sports stadium located in the hamlet of Jicarral, Puntarenas, Costa Rica and is the headquarters of Los Local de la Jicar Sercoba. It was inaugurated in 1981 and in 2019 he received several important remodeling in his infrastructure. The stadium is owned by the Jicaraleńa Civic Association and is the headquarters of Jicarral Sercoba, which is located in the Second Division of Costa Rica. It has capacity for 1500 amateurs, natural gramilla. Their gradues are celestial color and account by two sectors of the stadium. In this enclosure, several endings of the second division have been played where the local team achieved its ascent at the top category in 2019 after beating the Sports Association Guanacasteca.

CIAR
The team has the High Performance Integral Center (CIAR), which consists of a total of six hectares. Getting thanks to the sale of the player Freddy Álvarez to the FK SHKUPI team of the First Division of Macedonia. The CIAT has a natural grass gramilla that is by 105 x 70 meters. The new court is natural and equal to that of the institution's stadium. In addition, it has mobile goals for more comfort and professionalism. Containers that will serve as structures to place the utility, medical clinic and gym, which will have everything necessary to enhance players were already placed. All these works are already advanced and this economic amount received will help to continue with all this project, which will have a second floor, which will be rooms for minor leagues and with capacity for 60 people. The mission is that the Nicoya Peninsula looks benefited from the club project and that young people in the region are motivated to join the institution.

Current squad
As of February 2, 2023

References 

http://m.ceroacero.es/team.php?id=87349&search=1
http://uk.soccerway.com/teams/costa-rica/adr-jicaral/25239/

Association football clubs established in 1981
Football clubs in Costa Rica
1981 establishments in Costa Rica